The National Dissemination Center for Children with Disabilities (NICHCY, an acronym derived from its original name, National Information Center for Handicapped Children and Youth) operated as a national centralized information resource on disabilities and special education for children and youth ages birth through 21 years, sponsored by the U.S. Department of Education. It collected, organized, and disseminated current and accurate research-based information about childhood disability and special education. The center also disseminated information about the  Individuals with Disabilities Education Act, the nation's special education law and the No Child Left Behind Act, the nation's general education law.  NICHCY  focused on research, information dissemination, and providing quality information on teaching and learning. It was de-funded by the U.S. Department of Education in 2013. Its website remained available until September 2014, and its resources moved to the Center for Parent Information and Resources.

External links 
  for National Dissemination Center for Children with Disabilities (NICHCY)

Disability organizations based in the United States
Education in the United States
Special education
Adams Morgan